Chamtar Khan-e Sofla (also Romanized as Chamtar Khān-e Soflá; also known as Chamtar Khān-e Pā’īn, Kabūtār Khān-e Soflā, and Khalaf-e Nabī) is a village in Shoaybiyeh-ye Gharbi Rural District, Shadravan District, Shushtar County, Khuzestan Province, Iran. At the 2006 census, its population was 179, in 38 families.

References 

Populated places in Shushtar County